Bayless Lynn Greer (born November 20, 1941) is an American politician who served in the Alabama House of Representatives from 1974 to 1981, 2002 to 2006, and 2010 to 2022.

Politics
He is the incumbent of the 2nd District of the Alabama House of Representatives, serving since 2010. He is a member of the Republican Party. Greer also served in the House from 1974 to 1981 and from 2002 to 2006.

References

Living people
Republican Party members of the Alabama House of Representatives
1941 births
People from Rogersville, Alabama
21st-century American politicians